This is a list of the songs and hymns composed by Carl Nielsen.

Songs with piano

Solo voice and piano 

FS 12 (Op. 4)

 (Music to Five Poems by J. P. Jacobsen) for voice and piano (1891)
 "" ("Sunset")
 "" ("In the Harem Garden")
 "" ("To Asali")
 "" ("Irmelin")
 "" ("Has the Day Gathered All its Sorrow")

FS 13

Unpublished miscellaneous songs (1891)
 "" (Paludan-Müller)
 "" (Jacobsen)
 "" (Jacobsen)

FS 14  (Op. 6)

 (Songs and Verses by J. P. Jacobsen) for voice and piano (1891)
 "" ("Genre Piece")
 "" ("The Seraphs")
 "" ("Silken Shoes on a Golden Last")
 "" ("A Moment of Pleasure, an Age of Pain")
 "" ("Song from [the short story] 'Mogens'")

FS 18 (Op. 10). Seks Sange til Tekster af Ludvig Holstein (Six Songs on Texts by ) (1895–96)
 Du fine, hvide Æbleblomst (You apple blossom fine and white)
 Erindringens Sø (Lake of Memories)
 Sommersang (Summer Song)
 Sang bag Ploven (Song behind the Plough)
 I Aften (Tonight)
 Hilsen (Greeting)

FS 37. Hr. Oluf han rider (Sir Oluf Rides). Texts by Holger Drachmann (1906)
 I. Hellelidens Sang (Helleliden's Song)
 II. Hr. Olufs Sang (Sir Oluf's Song)
 III. Dansevise (Dancing Ballad)

FS 42 (Op. 21). Strofiske Sange (Strophic Songs) (1905–07)
 Volume 1
 I. Skal Blomsterne da visne (Shall flowers, then, all wither?). Text by Helge Rode
 II. Høgen (Hawk). Text by Jeppe Aakjær
 III. Jens Vejmand (Jens the Roadman). Text by Jeppe Aakjær
 Volume 2
 IV. Sænk kun dit Hoved du Blomst (Lay down, sweet flower, your head). Text by Johannes Jørgensen
 V. Den første Lærke (The larks are coming). Text by Jeppe Aakjær
 VI. Husvild (Vagrant). Text by Johannes Vilhelm Jensen
 VII. Godnat (Good Night). Text by Johannes Vilhelm Jensen

FS 43

Tove. Incidental music for the play by Ludvig Holstein. (1906–1908) The Score is lost, only the following four songs have survived:
 "" (We sons of the plains)
 "" (Bird-catcher's song)
 "" (Tove's song)
 "" (Hunter's song)

FS 44

Willemoes. Incidental music, text by L.C. Nielsen (1907–1908). Four songs were published:
 "" (The ocean around Denmark)
 "" (Vibeke's song)
 "" (Fatherland)
 "" (Yes, take us, our mother)

FS 50. To Sange fra Jeppe Aakjærs Skuespil "Ulvens Søn" (Two Songs for Jeppe Aakjær's Play "Ulven's Son") (1909)
 I. Gamle Anders Røgters Sang (Song of Old Anders the Cattleman)
 II. Kommer I snart, I Husmænd! (Now Is the Time, Smallholders!)

FS 70 & FS 78. En Snes danske Viser (A Score of Danish Songs). Collaboration with Thomas Laub; 23 songs by Nielsen, 21 by Laub. In two Volumes.
 Volume 1 (1913–15)
 I. De Refsnæsdrenge, de Samsøpiger (The Boys of Refsnæs, the Girls of Samsø). Text by Steen Steensen Blicher
 III. Ud gaar du nu paa Livets Vej (Now you must find your path in life). Text by Steen Steensen Blicher
 IVa. I Skyggen vi vanke (In shadows we wander). Text by Adam Oehlenschläger
 V. Underlige Aftenlufte! (Odd and unknown evening breezes!). Text by Adam Oehlenschläger
 VII. Naar Odin vinker (As Odin beckons). Text by Adam Oehlenschläger
 IX. Vender sig Lykken fra dig (Fortune has lately left you). Text by Carsten Hauch
 XI. Vor Verden priser jeg tusindfold (Our earth I magnify thousandfold). Text by Poul Martin Møller
 XII. Rosen blusser alt i Danas Have (Rose is blooming now in Dana's borders). Text by Poul Martin Møller
 XIV. Sov ind mit søde Nusseben! (Sleep tight, my ducky little dear!). Text by Poul Martin Møller
 XVI. Farvel, min velsignede Fødeby! (Farewell, my respectable native town!). Text by Poul Martin Møller
 XIX. Jeg bærer med Smil min Byrde (I take with a smile my burden). Text by Jeppe Aakjær
 XX. Nu er Dagen fuld af Sang (Now the day is full of song). Text by Jeppe Aakjær
Volume 2 (1914–17)
 XXVI. Nu er da Vaaren kommen (At last the spring's upon us). Text by Adam Oehlenschläger
 XXVII. Hvor sødt i Sommer-Aftenstunden (How sweet, as summer day is fading). Text by Adam Oehlenschläger
 XXVIII. Tidt er jeg glad, og vil dog gerne græde (Oft am I glad, still may I weep from sadness). Text by Bernhard Severin Ingemann
 XXXIII. Min lille Fugl, hvor flyver du (My little bird, where do you fly). Text by Hans Christian Andersen
 XXXIV. Hun mig har glemt! min Sorg hun ej see! (Forget she did! my woe is in vain!). Text by Hans Christian Andersen
 XXXV. Højt ligger paa Marken den hvide Sne (Snow covers the field, oh so deep and white). Text by Hans Christian Andersen
 XXXVIII. Nu springer Vaaren fra sin Seng (Now, spring is leaping out of bed). Text by Viggo Stuckenberg
 XL. Se dig ud en Sommerdag (Look about one summer day). Text by Jeppe Aakjær  
 XLI. Der dukker af Disen min Fædrenejord (There out of the fog looms my ancestors' land). Text by Jeppe Aakjær 
 XLII. Hør, hvor let dens Vinger smækker (Listen, how its pinions scuttle). Text by Jeppe Aakjær 
 XLIV. Der boede en Mand i Ribe By (There once lived a man in Ribe town). Traditional

FS 83. Salmer og Aandelige Sange, halvhundred nye Melodier for Hjem, Kirke og Skole (Hymns and Sacred Songs, Fifty New Melodies for Home, Church and School) (1912-1916)
 I. Ak, min Rose visner bort (Ah, my rose will fade away). Text by Hans Adolph Brorson
 II. Alt paa den vilde Hede (On moorland barren, level). Text by Nikolai Frederik Severin Grundtvig
 III. Denne er Dagen, som Herren har gjort! (This is the day that the Lord did create!). Text by Nikolai Frederik Severin Grundtvig
 IV. Den store, hvide Flok vi se (The great, white fl ock begins to show). Text by Hans Adolph Brorson
 V. Der er en Bøn paa Jorden (There is an earthly prayer). Text by Nikolai Frederik Severin Grundtvig
 VI. Der er en Vej, som Verden ikke kender (There is a way from mortals hid forever). Text by Nikolai Frederik Severin Grundtvig
 VII. Det er et Under paa Verdens Ø (A wondrous isle is the world, indeed). Text by Nikolai Frederik Severin Grundtvig
 VIII. Det koster ej for megen Strid (The strain is not too great). Text by Hans Adolph Brorson
 IX. Dig vil jeg elske, du min Styrke (Yea, I shall love Thee, Thou my vigour). Text by Hans Egede Glahn
 X. Drag, Jesus, mig (Oh Jesus, show me). Text by Hans Adolph Brorson
 XI. Dybt hælder Aaret i sin Gang (Well on the wane the passing year). Text by C.J. Boye
 XII. Et helligt Liv, en salig Død (A holy life, a blessed death). Text by Nikolai Frederik Severin Grundtvig
 XIII. Forunderligt at sige (How wonderful to ponder). Text by Nikolai Frederik Severin Grundtvig 
 XIV. Fred med dig! og Fred med eder! (Peace with you! And with each being!). Text by Nikolai Frederik Severin Grundtvig
 XV. Fred og Glæde, for dem græde (Peace and pleasure). Text by Nikolai Frederik Severin Grundtvig
 XVI. Frisk op! endnu en Gang (Refresh yourself in song). Text by Hans Adolph Brorson
 XVII. Glæden hun er født i Dag (Happiness is born today). Text by Thomas Kingo
 XVIII. Guds Engle i Flok! (God's angels, unite!). Text by Nikolai Frederik Severin Grundtvig
 XIX. Guds Fred er mer end Englevagt (God's peace is more than angel guard). Text by Nikolai Frederik Severin Grundtvig
 XX. Gud skal al Ting mage (God, the great creator). Text by Hans Adolph Brorson
 XXI. Har Haand du lagt paa Herrens Plov (When you take up the Master's plough). Text by Nikolai Frederik Severin Grundtvig
 XXII. Har nogen Lyst at kende (You want to know the seasons). Text by Nikolai Frederik Severin Grundtvig
 XXIII. Herren siger: Er I trætte (Are you tired, says the Master). Text by Nikolai Frederik Severin Grundtvig
 XXIV. Herrens Røst var over Vandet! (Voice of God above the ocean!). Text by Nikolai Frederik Severin Grundtvig
 XXV. Hvi vil du dig saá klage (Why do you wail, complaining). Text by Nikolai Frederik Severin Grundtvig
 XXVI. Jeg fandt en Trøst (I found support). Text by 
 XXVII. Jeg raaber fast, o Herre (I call out loud, oh Master). Text by Steen Bille
 XXVIII. Jeg ved et lille Himmerig (I know a little paradise). Text by Nikolai Frederik Severin Grundtvig
 XXIX. Korsets Tegn og Korsets Ord (Sign and word of cross a shock). Text by Nikolai Frederik Severin Grundtvig
 XXX. Luk Øjne op, al Kristenhed! (Lift up your eyes, all Christian men!). Text by Nikolai Frederik Severin Grundtvig
 XXXI. Maria sad paa Hø og Straa (The Virgin Mary sat in hay). Text by Nikolai Frederik Severin Grundtvig
 XXXII. Min Jesus, lad mit Hjerte faa (My Jesus, let my heart obtain). Text by Nikolai Frederik Severin Grundtvig
 XXXIII. Naar jeg betænker Tid og Stund (As I consider time and day). Text by Niels-Henning Ørsted Pedersen
 XXXIV. Nu Sol i Øst oprinder mild (Now the sun arises in the East). Text by 
 XXXV. O, havde jeg dog tusind Tunger (A thousand tongues my pure desire). Text by Hans Adolph Brorson
 XXXVI. O Helligaand! mit Hjerte (Oh Holy Ghost, my passion). Text by Hans Adolph Brorson
 XXXVII. O hør os, Herre, for din Død (Oh hear us, Master, for your death). Text by Nikolai Frederik Severin Grundtvig
 XXXVIII. O Kristelighed! (Christianity, lo!). Text by Nikolai Frederik Severin Grundtvig
 XXXIX. Op al den Ting, som Gud har gjort (Rise, all that God created here). Text by Hans Adolph Brorson
 XL. Op, I Kristne, ruster eder! (Rise, ye Christians, and get ready!). Text by Hans Adolph Brorson
 XLI. O, sad jeg, som Maria sad (Oh if I sat as Mary sat). Text by Marie Wexelsen
 XLII. Paa alle dine Veje (Where'er your path may take you). Text by Nikolai Frederik Severin Grundtvig
 XLIII. Som den gyldne Sol frembryder (As the golden sun emerges). Text by Thomas Kingo
 XLIV. Ton det, Himmel, syng det, Jord (Sound it, heaven, sing it, earth). Text by Nikolai Frederik Severin Grundtvig
 XLV. Uforsagt, hvordan min Lykke (Unafraid whate'er my chances). Text by Ambrosius Stub
 XLVI. Under Korset stod med Smerte ('Neath the Cross of the departed). Text by Nikolai Frederik Severin Grundtvig
 XLVII. Utallige Blomster paa Jorderig gro (Though countless the flowers that grow on the earth). Text by Nikolai Frederik Severin Grundtvig
 XLVIII. Verdens Børn har mangt et Sted (Worldlings have so many sites). Text by Nikolai Frederik Severin Grundtvig
 XLIX. Vor Herre, han er en Konge stor (The Lord is a king, immensely great). Text by Nikolai Frederik Severin Grundtvig

FS 86 (Op. 31). To Sange fra Valdemar Rørdams "Kantate ved Grosserer-Societetets Hundredaarsfest" (Two Songs from Valdemar Rørdam's "Cantata for the Centenary of the Chamber of Commerce") (1917)
 I. Købmands-Vise (Merchant Song)
 II. Hymne til Danmark (Hymn to Denmark)

FS 89 (Op. 34). Tre Sange fra Adam Oehlenschlägers Skuespil "Aladdin eller den forunderlige Lampe" (Three Songs from Adam Oehlenschläger's Play "Aladdin and the Wonderful Lamp") (1918–19)
 I. Cithar! Lad min Bøn dig røre (Zither! Touched by this my prayer)
 II. Visselulle nu, Barnlil! (Hushaby now, baby li'l!)
 III. Alt Maanen oprejst staar bag sorte Skove (Beyond black woods the moon)

FS 92. To aandelige Sange (Two Spiritual Songs) (1917–18)
 I. Den store Mester kommer (The greatest master cometh). Text by Bernhard Severin Ingemann
 II. Udrundne er de gamle Dage (Gone are the days, they're past and olden). Text by Nikolai Frederik Severin Grundtvig

FS 94 (Op. 41). Otte Sange fra Helge Rodes Skuespil "Moderen" (Eight Songs from Helge Rode's Play "The Mother") (1920)
 I. Vildt gaar Storm mod sorte Vande (Wild the storm on blackened waters)
 II. Min pige er saa lys som Rav (Like golden amber is my girl) 
 III. Dengang Ørnen var flyveklar (When the Eagle would fly to rule)
 IV. Ved Festen fik en Moder Bud (A mother at the feast was told)
 V. Tidselhøsten tegner godt (Thistle crop looks promising)
 VI. Saa bittert var mit Hjerte (My heart was truly bitter)
 VII. Dengang Døden var i Vente (Testament, as he was dying)
 VIII. Som en rejselysten Flaade (There's a fleet of floating islands)

FS 95. Tyve folkelige Melodier (Twenty Folklike Melodies) (1917–21)
 I. På det jævne, på det jævne! (Simple-rooted, simple-rooted!). Text by Hans Vilhelm Kaalund
 II. Derfor kan vort øje glædes (Wherefore do our eyes feel pleasure). Text by Christian Richardt
 III. Jeg så kun tilbage (I only looked back). Text by Bernhard Severin Ingemann
 IV. Morgendug der, sagte bæver (Morning dew that slightly trembles). Text by Carsten Hauch
 V. Jord, i hvis favn (Earth, whose embrace). Text by Christian Richardt
 VI. Den store Mester kommer! (The greatest master cometh!). Text by Bernhard Severin Ingemann
 VII. Der sad en fisker så tankefuld (There sat a fisherman deep in thought). Text by Nikolai Frederik Severin Grundtvig 
 VIII. St. St. Blicher (Steen Steensen Blicher). Text by Carl Ploug
 IX. Dér, hvor vi stred og sang (Where we would fight and sing). Text by Jens Christian Hostrup
 X. Når Somrens sang er sungen (When summer song is finished). Text by Jens Christian Hostrup
 XI. De snækker mødtes i kvæld på hav (The barques would meet on a sunset wave). Text by Nikolai Frederik Severin Grundtvig
 XII. Naturens ædle dyrker (The noble nature student). Text by Carsten Hauch
 XIII. Tunge, mørke natteskyer (Heavy, gloomy clouds of night). Text by Jakob Knudsen
 XIV. Som dybest Brønd gir altid klarest Vand (Like purest waters rise from deepest spring). Text by Jeppe Aakjær
 XV. Det danske Brød paa Sletten gror (The Danish bread, it grows on plains). Text by Jeppe Aakjær
 XVI. Udrundne er de gamle Dage (Gone are the days, they're past and olden). Text by Nikolai Frederik Severin Grundtvig
 XVII. Betragt mit svage spind (melodi a) (Behold my web, how frail (Melody a)). Text by Adam Oehlenschläger
 XVIII. Frihed er det bedste guld (Freedom is the purest gold). Text by Thomas av Strängnäs
 XIX. Nu lyser Løv i Lunde (The greenwood leaves are light now). Text by Johannes Jørgensen 
 XX. Syndfloden (The Flood). Text by Nikolai Frederik Severin Grundtvig

FS 101

, "Four Folklike Melodies". Songs, texts by C. Richardt (1), B. Bjørnson (2,) C. Hostrup (3), N. F. S. Grundtvig (1922)

 "" ("Teach Me, Oh Stars of the Night") Text by Christian Richardt
 "" ("The Song Casts Light") Text by Bjørnstjerne Bjørnson
 "" ("Of What do You Sing") Text by Jens Christian Hostrup
 "" ("Now Shall it be Revealed"). Text by Nikolai Frederik Severin Grundtvig

FS 103

, The Folk High School Melody Book. Collection of Songs, ed. by Thorvald Aagaard, in collaboration with Carl Nielsen, Th. Laub, and O. Ring (1922).
 Den store Mester kommer! (The greatest master cometh!). Text by Bernhard Severin Ingemann
 Påskeblomst! (The Daffodil). Text by Nikolai Frederik Severin Grundtvig
 Udrundne er de gamle Dage (Gone are the days, they're past and olden). Text by Nikolai Frederik Severin Grundtvig
 Betragt mit svage spind (Behold my web, how frail). Text by Adam Oehlenschläger
 Jord, i hvis favn (Earth, whose embrace). Text by Christian Richardt
 Jeg så kun tilbage (I only looked back). Text by Bernhard Severin Ingemann
 Derfor kan vort øje glædes (Wherefore do our eyes feel pleasure). Text by Christian Richardt
 Naturens ædle dyrker (The noble nature student). Text by Carsten Hauch
 Når Somrens sang er sungen (When summer song is finished). Text by Jens Christian Hostrup
 Dér, hvor vi stred og sang (Where we would fight and sing). Text by Jens Christian Hostrup
 Vi fik ej under tidernes tryk (The stress of years could not jade our mind). Text by Jens Christian Hostrup
 På det jævne, på det jævne! (Simple-rooted, simple-rooted!). Text by Hans Vilhelm Kaalund
 Syndfloden (The Flood). Text by Nikolai Frederik Severin Grundtvig
 Der sad en fisker så tankefuld (There sat a fisherman deep in thought). Text by Nikolai Frederik Severin Grundtvig
 De snækker mødtes i kvæld på hav (The barques would meet on a sunset wave). Text by Nikolai Frederik Severin Grundtvig
 St. St. Blicher (Steen Steensen Blicher). Text by Carl Ploug
 Morgendug der, sagte bæver (Morning dew that slightly trembles). Text by Carsten Hauch
 Underlige Aftenlufte! (Odd and unknown evening breezes!). Text by Adam Oehlenschläger
 Rosen blusser alt i Danas Have (Rose is blooming now in Dana's borders) [only stanzas 1, 4-5, 7-9, 11-12]. Text by Poul Martin Møller
 Tunge, mørke natteskyer (Heavy, gloomy clouds of night). Text by Jakob Knudsen
 Jeg bærer med Smil min Byrde (I take with a smile my burden). Text by Jeppe Aakjær 
 Du danske mand! af al din magt syng (Sing, Danish man! With all your might). Text by Holger Drachmann 
 Vender sig Lykken fra dig (Fortune has lately left you). Text by Carsten Hauch
 Som dybest Brønd gir altid klarest Vand (Like purest waters rise from deepest spring). Text by Jeppe Aakjær
 Nu er Dagen fuld af Sang (Now the day is full of song). Text by Jeppe Aakjær
 Nu springer Vaaren fra sin Seng (Now, spring is leaping out of bed). Text by Viggo Stuckenberg
 Nu lyser Løv i Lunde (The greenwood leaves are light now). Text by Johannes Jørgensen
 De Refsnæsdrenge, de Samsøpiger (The Boys of Refsnæs, the Girls of Samsø). Text by Steen Steensen Blicher
 Farvel, min velsignede Fødeby! (Farewell, my respectable native town!). Text by Poul Martin Møller
 Se dig ud en Sommerdag (Look about one summer day). Text by Jeppe Aakjær
 I Skyggen vi vanke (In shadows we wander). Text by Adam Oehlenschläger
 Som en rejselysten Flaade (There's a fleet of floating islands). Text by Helge Rode

FS 114

 "" (Ten Little Danish Songs") Texts by various authors (1923–24)
 "" (I Know a Lark's Nest") (H. Bergstedt)
 "" (The Sun is So Red, Mother") (H. Bergstedt)
 "" (As Quietly as the Stream Runs in the Meadow") (H. Rode)
 "" (The Sparrow Sits in Silence Behind the Gable") (J. Aakjær)
 "" (The Musician is Playing his Fiddle") (M. Damm)
 "" (When Small Children Whimper at Eventide") (C. Dabelsteen)
 "" (Green in the Hedge in Spring") (P. Martin Møller) 
 "" ("I Settle Down to Sleep so Snugly") (Chr. Winter)
 "" ("Oh, Today I am so Happy") (M. Rosing)
 "" ("The Danish Song") (K. Hoffmann). Ti danske Smaasange (Ten Little Danish Songs) (1923–24)

FS 115

 (Four Jutlandish Songs). Texts by A. Berntsen (1924–25)
 "" ("Jens Madsen to An-Sofi")
 "" ("Our Daughter")
 "" ("One and the Other")
 "" ("The Haypole")

FS 125. Tillæg til Folkehøjskolens Melodibog (Supplement to the Folk High School Melody Book)
 Lær mig, nattens stjærne (Teach me, star, precisely). Text by Christian Richardt
 Sangen har lysning (Singing illumines). Text by Bjørnstjerne Bjørnson
 Hvad synger du om så højt i det blå? (Of what do you sing up there in the blue?). Text by Jens Christian Hostrup
 Danevang med grønne bred (Denmark with your verdant shore). Text by Bernhard Severin Ingemann
 Nu skal det åbenbares (This is the revelation). Text by Nikolai Frederik Severin Grundtvig
 Jens Vejmand (Jens the Roadman). Text by Jeppe Aakjær
 Vi nævner et navn (We mention a name). Text by Knut Hamsun
 Havets Sang (Song of the Sea). Text by Laurits Christian Nielsen
 Vi sletternes sønner har drømme i sind (We, sons of the plains carry dreams in our minds). Text by Ludvig Holstein
 Der dukker af Disen min Fædrenejord (There out of the fog looms my ancestors' land). Text by Jeppe Aakjær
 Kan I mærke, det lysner af solskin i sindet (Do you feel how your mind from the sunshine grows lighter). Text by Jonas Gudlaugsson
 Frydeligt med jubelkor (Jubilation, shouts of glee). Text by Morten Børup 
 Vinden er så føjelig (Winds are so employable). Text by Holger Drachmann
 Mit hjem, hvor mine fædres fjed (My home, where my forefathers' tread). Text by Peder Rasmussen Møller
 Der er en gammel rønne her udenfor vor by (There is a hoary hovel just outside this our town). Text by Mads Hansen
 Om strømmen mod dig bruser – vov at stå! (If torrents rush against you – dare resist!). Text by Steen Steensen Blicher
 Ud gaar du nu paa Livets Vej (Now you must find your path in life). Text by Steen Steensen Blicher
 Sang bag Ploven (Song behind the Plough). Text by Ludvig Holstein

Separate songs

Recitation and piano (or orchestra) 
FS 134. Island (Iceland) (1929). Text by Otto Lagoni.

Choir and piano 
FS 65. To Sange fra Adam Oehlenschlägers "Sanct Hansaftenspil" (Two Songs from Adam Oehlenschläger's "Midsummer Eve Play") (1913)
 I. I Skyggen vi vanke (In shadows we wander), for SSAA choir and piano
 II. I Maaneskin titter (As moonlight entrances), for SSATTBB choir and piano

Songs with instrumental ensemble 
FS 42, No. 4. Sænk kun dit Hoved du Blomst (Lay down, sweet flower, your head), for voice and orchestra. Text by Johannes Jørgensen (1906)

FS 110. Der er et yndigt land (There is a lovely country), for voice and orchestra. Text by Adam Oehlenschläger (1924) 

FS 114, No. 5. Den Spillemand spiller paa Strenge (The fiddler is playing his fiddle), for voice and three violins. Text by Mads Damm (1923/1924)

Songs for a cappella choir

Mixed choir

Collections 
FS 54. To Sange fra "Kantate ved Aarhus Landsudstillings Aabnings-Højtidelighed 1909" (Two Songs from "Cantata for the Opening Ceremony of the National Exhibition of 1909 in Aarhus"), for SATB choir. Text by Laurits Christian Nielsen (1909)
 I. Skummende laa Havet (Foaming high, the waters rushed heavily ashore)
 II. Danmark, du kornblonde Datter (Denmark, ye corn-golden daughter)

FS 138

To Skolesange (Two School Songs) for unaccompanied choir, text by V. Stuckenberg (1929)
 "" ("Pollen from the Calyx")
 "" ("Now for a Brief Time it's Over"')

FS 139 (Op. 55). Tre Motetter (Three Motets). Texts selected by Carl Nielsen and Anne Marie Carl-Nielsen (1929)
 I. Afflictus sum, (Psalm 38:9, Danish and French Psalm 37), for ATTB choir
 II. Dominus regit me, (Psalm 23:1-2, Danish and French Psalm 22), for SATB choir
 III. Benedictus, benedictus Dominus, (Psalm 31:22, Danish and French Psalm 30), for SSATB choir

Separate songs

Male choir

Equal voices 
FS 111

Sangbogen Danmark (Songbook Denmark); a collection of Danish and Scandinavian songs, includes a foreword and some new songs by Nielsen; edited by Carl Nielsen and Hakon Andersen (every song is scored for soprano and alto) (1924)
 I. Danevang med grønne bred (Denmark with your verdant shore). Text by Bernhard Severin Ingemann
 II. Der er et yndigt land (There is a lovely country). Text by Adam Oehlenschläger
 III. Rosen blusser alt i Danas Have (Rose is blooming now in Dana's borders). Text by Poul Martin Møller
 IV. Lad en og anden have Ret (Let people, just a few, be right). Text by Peter Faber
 V. Morgendug der, sagte bæver (Morning dew that slightly trembles). Text by Carsten Hauch
 VI. Se dig ud en Sommerdag (Look about one summer day). Text by Jeppe Aakjær
 VII. Fædrelandssang (Du danske mand! af al din magt syng) (Danish Patriotic Song (Sing, Danish man! With all your might)). Text by Holger Drachmann
 VIII. Du gav os de Blomster, som lyste imod os (You gave us the flowers that glistered to show us). Text by Helge Rode
 IX. Danmark (Denmark). Text by Axel Juel
 X. Som en rejselysten Flaade (There's a fleet of floating islands). Text by Helge Rode
 XI. Kær est du, Fødeland, sødt er dit Navn (So dear my native land, thy name so sweet). Text by Steen Steensen Blicher
 XII. Der dukker af Disen min Fædrenejord (There out of the fog looms my ancestors' land). Text by Jeppe Aakjær
 XIII. Hjemvee (Underlige Aftenlufte!) (Homesickness (Odd and unknown evening breezes!)). Text by Adam Oehlenschläger
 XIV. Den kedsom Vinter gik sin Gang (The tedious winter went its course). Text by Ambrosius Stub
 XV. Frydeligt med jubelkor (Jubilation, shouts of glee). Text by Morten Børup
 XVI. Grøn er Vaarens Hæk (Springtime hedge is green). Text by Poul Martin Møller
 XVII. Nu er Dagen fuld af Sang (Now the day is full of song). Text by Jeppe Aakjær
 XVIII. I Skyggen vi vanke (In shadows we wander). Text by Adam Oehlenschläger
 XIX. Nu lyser Løv i Lunde (The greenwood leaves are light now). Text by Johannes Jørgensen
 XX. O, hvor jeg er glad i Dag! (Oh, how glad I am today!). Text by Michael Rosing
 XXI. Nu Sol i Øst oprinder mild (Now the sun arises in the East). Text by Carl Joakim Brandt
 XXII. Jeg lægger mig saa trygt til ro (In peace, I lay me down to sleep). Text by Christian Winther
 XXIII. Tyst som Aa i Engen rinder (Silent as a stream's meander). Text by Helge Rode
 XXIV. Sol er oppe! Skovens Toppe (Sun arises! Treetop guises). Text by Nikolai Frederik Severin Grundtvig
 XXV. De snækker mødtes i kvæld på hav (The barques would meet on a sunset wave). Text by Nikolai Frederik Severin Grundtvig
 XXVI. Søndret Folk er vokset sammen (Grown together, sundered nation). Text by Helge Rode
 XXVII. Udrundne er de gamle Dage (Gone are the days, they're past and olden). Text by Nikolai Frederik Severin Grundtvig
 XXVIII. De Unges Sang (Song of the Young). Text by Jens Christian Hostrup
 XXIX. Hymne til Danmark (Hymn to Denmark). Text by Valdemar Rørdam
 XXX. Er din Stue lav og trang (Is your dwelling low and tight). Text by Laurits Christian Nielsen
 XXXI. På det jævne, på det jævne! (Simple-rooted, simple-rooted!). Text by Hans Vilhelm Kaalund
 XXXII. Byg paa Slet ten, ej paa Tin den (Build on lowland, not above it). Text by Zakarias Nielsen
 XXXIII. Vi fri Folk fra Norden (We free Nordic nation). Text by Valdemar Rørdam
 XXXIV. Vældige Riger rives om Jorden (Mighty the realms that rend earth asunder). Text by Ahrent Otterstrøm
 XXXV. Havets Sang (Song of the Sea). Text by Laurits Christian Nielsen
 XXXVI. Når Somrens sang er sungen (When summer song is finished). Text by Jens Christian Hostrup
 XXXVII. Sov, mit Barn, sov længe (Sleep, my child, sleep sweetly). Text by Christian Richardt
 XXXVIII. Spurven sidder stum bag Kvist (Sparrows hushed behind the bough). Text by Jeppe Aakjær
 XXXIX. Farvel, min velsignede Fødeby! (Farewell, my respectable native town!). Text by Poul Martin Møller
 XL. Ud gaar du nu paa Livets Vej (Now you must find your path in life). Text by Steen Steensen Blicher (only stanzas 1, 3-5)
 XLI. Jeg ved en Lærkerede (Two larks in love have nested). Text by Harald Bergstedt
 XLII. Solen er saa rød, Mor (Look! The sun is red, mum). Text by Harald Bergstedt
 XLIII. Den Spillemand spiller paa Strenge (The fiddler is playing his fiddle). Text by Mads Damm
 XLIV. Naar Smaabørn klynker ved Aftentide (When babies whimper before the candle). Text by Christian Dabelsteen

FS 152

60 Danske Kanoner (60 Danish Canons); six of them by Nielsen (1930), for unaccompanied choir, texts by Carl Nielsen (1), H. C. Andersen (2), Holberg (3 and 4, translated by S. Muller), Book of Job (5), Carl Nielsen (6, his motto to the Helios Overture) (1930)
 "" ("The Boxers")
 "" ("The Thread Snaps")
 "" ("Watchman I Beg You")
 "" ("It Isn't Always So")
 "" ("At Destruction and Famine Thou Shalt Laugh")
 "" ("Silence and Dark")

Separate songs 
Every song scored for soprano and alto.

Unison songs

Collections 
FS 75. Melodier til Johan Borups Sangbog (Melodies for Johan Borup's Song Book) (1915)

FS 120. Nye Melodier til Johan Borups Sangbog (New Melodies for Johan Borup's Song Book) (1926)
 Morgenhanen atter gol (Morning cock again did crow). Nikolai Frederik Severin Grundtvig
 Vaaren, Vaaren er i Brud (Springtime, Springtime breaking through). Text by Morten & Marinus Børup
 Grøn er Vaarens Hæk (Springtime hedge is green). Text by Poul Martin Møller
 Ind under Jul, hvor er det trist (Nigh to Noel, how very sad). Text by Jonas Lie
 Nu spinder vi for Dittemor (We're spinning now for Lizzy Lass). Text by Martin Andersen Nexø
 Undrer mig paa, hvad jeg faar at se (Wonder whatever I get to see). Text by Bjørnstjerne Bjørnson
 Spurven sidder stum bag Kvist (Sparrows hushed behind the bough). Text by Jeppe Aakjær (only stanzas 1, 5, 7-8)
 I kølende Skygger (In shadows so bracing). Text by Johannes Ewald
 En Sømand med et modigt Bryst (A sailor with a plucky breast). Text by Johannes Ewald
 Den gamle Husmand staar ved Gavl (An old smallholder at his ground). Text by Johan Skjoldborg
 Hver har sit, du har dit og jeg har mit (You and I, everyone must qualify). Text by Laurits Christian Nielsen
 Jeg kører frem gennem Straalefryd (I drive along in a splendent spell). Text by Bjørnstjerne Bjørnson
 Dannebrog, vift med din Vinge (Dannebrog, flag in a flutter). Text by Steen Steensen Blicher
 Jeg er saa glad i Grunden (I'm really so delighted). Text by Bjørnstjerne Bjørnson
 Den Magt som gav mig min lille Sang (This force which gave me my little song). Text by Bjørnstjerne Bjørnson
 Har I nu Tænder i Riven sat (Now, did the rake get its latter prong). Text by Jeppe Aakjær

Separate songs

See also 
 List of compositions by Carl Nielsen

References 
 The Carl Nielsen Edition, Volume III: Songs, Vol. 1-3; Edition Wilhelm Hansen, Product no. WH31333

Further reading

External links 
 Catalogue of Carl Nielsen's Works (CNW)
 Complete digital scores of Nielsen's complete works (The Carl Nielsen Edition)
 "Förunderligt och märkligt" recording with 

 
Nielsen, Carl